Nepal Bharat Library or more generally called the Indian Library is run by the Indian Embassy in Kathmandu, Nepal. The library was called Nepal-Bharat Sanskritik Kendra  till 2005. The library was established in 1951 after India set up the diplomatic relation with Nepal (13 June 1947) with an aim to enhance and strengthen cultural relations and information exchange between India and Nepal. It is the first foreign library in Nepal. Initially, the library was located in Basantapur, however in 1970, it was relocated to New Road. In 1980s the average visitors were 1,150 per daily. The number of visitors has reduced to about 300 per day in 2020.

Facilities
The library has a floor area of 3,474 sq. ft.
As per the statistics of 1980s, there are approximately 46,000 books. The books are mostly written in Devanagari scripts. As of 2020, the book collection is 62,000.
Book lending is available through membership cards for 14 days.
Audio-visual facility

Opening hours
The library is open 6 days a week; 12:00 to 17:00 for the public and 11:00 to 17:00 for the staff members.

See also
Nepal National Library
National Braille Library

References

External links

Libraries in Nepal
1951 establishments in Nepal